The 2022 Hall of Fame Open was a men's tennis tournament played on outdoor grass courts. It was the 46th edition of the event, and part of the 250 series of the 2022 ATP Tour. It took place at the International Tennis Hall of Fame in Newport, Rhode Island, United States, from July 10 through July 17, 2022.

Champions

Singles 

  Maxime Cressy def.  Alexander Bublik, 2–6, 6–3, 7–6(7–3)

Doubles 

  William Blumberg /  Steve Johnson def.  Raven Klaasen /  Marcelo Melo, 6–4, 7–5

Points and prize money

Point distribution

Prize money 

*per team

Singles main draw entrants

Seeds

 1 Rankings are as of June 27, 2022.

Other entrants
The following players received wildcards into the main draw:
  Félix Auger-Aliassime
  Andy Murray
  Max Purcell

The following players received entry from the qualifying draw:
  William Blumberg
  Liam Broady
  Christopher Eubanks
  Mitchell Krueger

Withdrawals 
Before the tournament
  Jenson Brooksby → replaced by  Stefan Kozlov
  Jack Draper → replaced by  Tim van Rijthoven
  Ilya Ivashka → replaced by  Feliciano López
  Denis Kudla → replaced by  Jack Sock

Doubles main draw entrants

Seeds

1 Rankings are as of June 27, 2022.

Other entrants
The following pairs received wildcards into the doubles main draw:
  Félix Auger-Aliassime /  Benjamin Bonzi
  Richard Ciamarra /  Sam Querrey

Withdrawals
Before the tournament
  Maxime Cressy /  Marc-Andrea Hüsler → replaced by  Max Schnur /  Artem Sitak
  Matthew Ebden /  Max Purcell → replaced by  Max Purcell /  Tim van Rijthoven
  William Blumberg /  Jack Sock → replaced by  William Blumberg /  Steve Johnson
  Treat Huey /  Denis Kudla → replaced by  Radu Albot /  Treat Huey
  Sadio Doumbia /  Fabien Reboul → replaced by  Nicholas Monroe /  Fabien Reboul

References

External links 
 

Hall of Fame Open
Hall of Fame Open
Hall of Fame Open
Halloffame
Hall of Fame Open